Ignacio Coll Riudavets (born 5 September 1987) is a Spanish tennis player. He has appeared in the main draw of one ATP Tour event.

In 2009, Coll Riudavets played doubles with Rafael Nadal at the Rotterdam Open, losing in the first round.

Coll Riudavets' best singles rank is World No. 412 and best doubles rank is No. 282.

External links
 
 

1987 births
Living people
Spanish male tennis players
Place of birth missing (living people)
21st-century Spanish people
Sportspeople from Menorca